John W. Gurnett (August 28, 1865 – December 3, 1920) was an American businessman and politician from New York.

Life 
Gurnett was born on August 28, 1865 in Watkins Glen, New York, the son of John Gurnett. He was a member of the clothing firm Moran & Gurnett. He also operated a store in Amsterdam and worked in road construction.

In 1904, Gurnett was elected to the New York State Assembly as a Democrat, representing Schuyler County. He served in the Assembly in 1905, 1906, 1911, 1912, and 1913. He also served as town supervisor for Dix for eight years.

In 1896, Gurnett married Katherine Green of Montour Falls. Their children were John, George, and Margaret.

Gurnett died at home on December 3, 1920. He was buried in St. Mary's Cemetery.

References

External links 

 The Political Graveyard
 John W. Gurnett at Find a Grave

1865 births
1920 deaths
People from Watkins Glen, New York
20th-century American politicians
Democratic Party members of the New York State Assembly
Town supervisors in New York (state)
Burials in New York (state)